"Exactly What You Wanted" is a song by American alternative metal band Helmet. The song was released in 1997 as the first single from the band's fourth studio album Aftertaste.

Music video
A music video was released for the song and shows the band performing the song live.

Track listing
Promo single

Maxi single

Chart positions

Personnel
 Page Hamilton – vocals, guitar
 Henry Bogdan – bass
 John Stanier – drums

References

1997 songs
1997 singles
Helmet (band) songs
Interscope Records singles
Songs written by Page Hamilton
Song recordings produced by Dave Sardy